The Roman Catholic Archdiocese of Toluca (erected 4 June 1950 as a diocese and 28 September 2019 as an archdiocese) is a metropolitan archdiocese of the Catholic Church. Along with the Dioceses of Acapulco, Chilapa and Tacámbaro, it lost territory when the Diocese of Ciudad Altamirano was erected in 1964. It further lost territory in 1984 with the formation of the Diocese of Atlacomulco. On 26 November 2009, it lost territory again when Pope Benedict XVI created another suffragan diocese for the Archdiocese of Mexico, the Diocese of Tenancingo.

On 28 September 2019, Pope Francis changed the status of the diocese to that of a metropolitan archdiocese and assigned to it three suffragan dioceses that until then were suffragans of the Archdiocese of Mexico: Atlacomulco, Tenancingo, and Cuernavaca.

Ordinaries
Archbishops
Arturo Vélez Martínez (1951–1979) 
Alfredo Torres Romero (1980–1995) 
Francisco Robles Ortega (1996–2003) appointed Archbishop of Monterrey, Nuevo León; elevated to Cardinal in 2008
Francisco Javier Chavolla Ramos (2003–2022)
Raúl Gómez González (2022–present)

Auxiliary bishop
José Francisco Robles Ortega (1991–1996), appointed bishop here; later cardinal
Maximino Martínez Miranda (2017–present)

Other priests of this diocese who became bishops
Felipe Arizmendi Esquivel, appointed Bishop of Tapachula, Chiapas in 1991
José Miguel Ángel Giles Vázquez, appointed Bishop of Ciudad Altamirano, Guerrero in 2004
Adolfo Miguel Castaño Fonseca, appointed Auxiliary Bishop of México, Federal District in 2010
Juan Odilón Martínez García, appointed Bishop of Atlacomulco, México in 2010
Luis Manuel López Alfaro (priest here, 1991–2004), appointed Auxiliary Bishop of San Cristóbal de Las Casas in 2020

Episcopal See
Toluca, State of México

References

External links and references

Toluca
Christian organizations established in 1950
Roman Catholic dioceses and prelatures established in the 20th century
A
Toluca
1950 establishments in Mexico
Roman Catholic ecclesiastical provinces in Mexico